NCAA Track and Field Championship may refer to:

In the United States:
NCAA Men's Outdoor Track and Field Championship
NCAA Men's Division I Outdoor Track and Field Championships
NCAA Men's Division II Outdoor Track and Field Championships
NCAA Men's Division III Outdoor Track and Field Championships
NCAA Men's Indoor Track and Field Championship
NCAA Men's Division I Indoor Track and Field Championships
NCAA Men's Division II Indoor Track and Field Championships
NCAA Men's Division III Indoor Track and Field Championships
NCAA Women's Outdoor Track and Field Championship
NCAA Women's Division I Outdoor Track and Field Championships
NCAA Women's Division II Outdoor Track and Field Championships
NCAA Women's Division III Outdoor Track and Field Championships
NCAA Women's Indoor Track and Field Championship
NCAA Women's Division I Indoor Track and Field Championships
NCAA Women's Division II Indoor Track and Field Championships
NCAA Women's Division III Indoor Track and Field Championships

In the Philippines:
NCAA Track and Field Championship (Philippines)